Bruce Verdell Gaston, Jr. (born November 29, 1991) is a former American football defensive tackle. He played college football at Purdue. Gaston was signed by the Arizona Cardinals as an undrafted free agent in 2014. He has been a member of the New England Patriots, Miami Dolphins, Green Bay Packers, Chicago Bears, Minnesota Vikings, San Diego Chargers, Philadelphia Eagles, Carolina Panthers, Detroit Lions and Ottawa Redblacks.

Professional career

Arizona Cardinals 
After going undrafted in the 2014 NFL Draft, he signed with the Arizona Cardinals. He was waived on August 30, 2014.

New England Patriots 
He was signed to the Patriots’ practice squad on August 31, 2014, but was later waived on September 3, 2014.

Miami Dolphins 
On September 4, 2014, Gaston was signed to the Dolphins’ active roster, but was later waived on September 20. He signed with their practice squad on September 23, 2014.

Arizona Cardinals 
Gaston joined the Cardinals’ active roster by being signed off the Dolphins’ practice squad on September 24, 2014. He was later waived on November 1, 2014, but was signed to Arizona’s practice squad on November 4, 2014.

Green Bay Packers 
He was signed to the Packers’ active roster from the Cardinals’ practice squad on December 8, 2014. He was later waived on October 3, 2015, but was signed to their practice squad on October 6, 2015.

Chicago Bears 
On October 17, 2015, Gaston was signed off the Packers' practice squad by the Chicago Bears to their active roster. He played in seven games for the Bears in 2015, recording 11 total tackles and one sack. He was released by the Bears on May 16, 2016.

Minnesota Vikings 
Gaston signed with the Minnesota Vikings on May 31, 2016. He was released by the team on June 16, 2016.

San Diego Chargers 
Gaston signed with the San Diego Chargers on July 31, 2016. On August 29, 2016, the Chargers waived him.

Philadelphia Eagles 
Gaston signed with the Eagles on August 30, 2016. On September 3, 2016, he was released by the Eagles.

Carolina Panthers 
On November 8, 2016, Gaston was signed to the Panthers' practice squad. He was released by the Panthers on November 22, 2016.

Detroit Lions 
On June 8, 2017, Gaston signed with the Detroit Lions. He was waived/injured on August 21, 2017 and placed on injured reserve. He was released on August 26, 2017.

Ottawa Redblacks 
On May 23, 2018 the Ottawa Redblacks of the Canadian Football League (CFL) announced the signing of Gaston. He was released on June 9, 2018.

References

External links 
Purdue Boilermakers bio
Chicago Bears bio
ESPN.com profile
Career stats

1991 births
Living people
Players of American football from Chicago
American football defensive tackles
Purdue Boilermakers football players
Arizona Cardinals players
New England Patriots players
Miami Dolphins players
Green Bay Packers players
Chicago Bears players
Minnesota Vikings players
San Diego Chargers players
Philadelphia Eagles players
Carolina Panthers players
Detroit Lions players
Ottawa Redblacks players